Kay Michille Brummond is an American synthetic chemist who is Professor of Chemistry and Associate Dean of Faculty at the University of Pittsburgh. Her interests consider cycloaddition reactions that can realise molecules and natural products for organic photovoltaics and targeted covalent inhibitors. She was elected a Fellow of the American Chemical Society (ACS) in 2010, a Fellow of the AAAS in 2021, and awarded the ACS National Award for Encouraging Women into Careers in the Chemical Sciences in 2021.

Early life and education 
Brummond grew up in the town of Herman in eastern Nebraska. She grew up on a corn and soybeans farm, and was the first member of her family to attend college. She attended the Tekamah-Herman High School and earned her undergraduate degree in secondary education (B.S.) at the University of Nebraska–Lincoln. She moved to Pennsylvania State University for her doctoral research, where she focused on organic synthesis with Raymond L. Funk. In 1991, she joined the University of Rochester, where she spent two years as a postdoctoral researcher with Robert K. Boeckman, Jr.

Research and career 
In 1993, Brummond joined the faculty at West Virginia University, where she was eventually promoted to Associate Professor. She moved to the University of Pittsburgh in 2001, where she was promoted to Professor in 2006 and elected department chair in 2014. Since 2017, Brummond is serving as the Associate Dean of Faculty for the Dietrich School of Arts and Sciences at the University of Pittsburgh . 

Brummond studies the Pauson–Khand reaction, targeted covalent inhibitors, transition-metal catalyzed cyclocarbonylation, and dearomative cycloaddition reactions. She works on the design, synthesis, and characterization of guaianolide analog covalent inhibitors with muted reactivity to thiols. In particular, she is interested in identifying the structure–activity relationships of these analogs. To assemble the 5,7,5-ring system, Brummond uses an allenic Pauson–Khand reactions and other cyclization process. To regulate the thiol reactivity and increase affinity for the kinase and protease targets, Brummond modifies the covalent reactive groups.

She has designed novel transition metal catalysts, including Rh(I). She has shown that stereoconvergent allenic Pauson–Khand reactions catalysed by Rh(I) can result in highly enantioselective 5,7-ring systems, which enable the enantioselective synthesis of compounds such as thapsigargin. Her approach includes collaborations with computational chemists for the rational design of transition metal catalysts and ligands through analysis of transition-state structures and energies to achieve stereoselective reaction products.

Academic service 
Brummond has advocated for women and underrepresented groups in science. She has worked with both her home institutions and the American Chemical Society to improve gender balance, and recognized for this work as the Diversity Catalyst Lecturer by the Open Chemistry Collaborative in Diversity Equity (OXIDE) partnership mechanism in 2014. She established the University of Pittsburgh Summer Undergraduate Research Fellowship (SURF) program, which offers research placements to undergraduate students. She launched various outreach programs to introduce young girls to scientific careers. Brummond has created a list of actions that people can take to become an ally to women working in chemistry, namely; Inviting a woman chemist to give a seminar;
 Engaging with women’s research;
 Developing an inclusivity and/or diversity statement together with your research group;
 Nominating a woman for an award;
 Educating yourself on gender disparities, and barriers, and know the data;
 Celebrating the chemistry achievements of women;
 Working to prepare the next generation of women chemists;
 Mitigating unconscious biases through your actions; and
 Working to fix the institution not the individual.

Symposiums and Conferences Organized 
Brummond has been active in organizing or co-organizing several national chemistry conferences including:

 Vice Chair - 2003 Organic Reactions and Processes Gordon Research Conference
 Chair - 2004 Organic Reactions and Processes Gordon Research Conference
 Co-organizer - "Accelerated Reaction Discovery" at the Telluride Science Research Center - 2011 to 2021
 Co-organizer - The 44th National Organic Chemistry Symposium, University of Maryland, College Park, MD - 2015
 Executive Officer - The 45th National Organic Chemistry Symposium, UC-Davis CA - 2017

Awards and honors 
 2006 American Chemical Society Akron Section Award
2007 Carnegie Science Center Emerging Female Scientist Award
 2010 Elected Fellow of the American Chemical Society
2015 American Chemical Society Pittsburgh Award
 2016 Diversity Catalyst Lecturer, Open Chemistry Collaborative in Diversity Equity (OXIDE) partnership, Johns Hopkins University
2016 Harold Kohn Endowed Alumni Lectureship, Department of Chemistry, Pennsylvania State University
 2018 University of Pittsburgh Provost's Spotlight on Women Leaders Series 
 2018 Chancellor's Distinguished Public Service Award
 2020 American Chemical Society Remarkable Woman in Organic Chemistry
 2021 American Chemical Society Award for Encouraging Women into Careers in the Chemical Sciences
 2021 Elected Fellow of the American Association for the Advancement of Science
 2022 Elected to the Board of Directors of Organic Syntheses

Selected publications 

 Eric D. Deihl; Luke T. Jesikiewicz; Logan J. Newman; Peng Liu; Kay M. Brummond 
 Lauren C. Burrows; Luke T. Jesikiewicz; Peng Liu; Kay M. Brummond 
 Paul A. Jackson; Henry A. M. Schares; Katherine F. Jones; John C. Widen; Daniel Dempe; Matthew Cuellar; Michael Walters; Daniel A. Harki; Kay M. Brummond 
 Lauren C. Parrette; Luke T. Jesikiewicz; Gang Lu; Steve J. Geib; Peng Liu; Kay M. Brummond 

 
 Kay M. Brummond; Laura S. Kocsis 
 
For comprehensive listing of publications, see: https://scholar.google.com/citations?user=6iI4MkEAAAAJ&hl=en

References 

University of Pittsburgh faculty
University of Nebraska–Lincoln alumni
Pennsylvania State University alumni
People from Washington County, Nebraska
20th-century American women scientists
American women chemists
Fellows of the American Chemical Society
Scientists from Nebraska
21st-century American chemists
20th-century American chemists
West Virginia University faculty
21st-century American women scientists
Living people
Year of birth missing (living people)